Hermione is a 32-gun Concorde-class frigate fitted for 12-pounder guns, completed in Rochefort by the Asselin organisation in 2014. It is a reproduction of the 1779 Hermione, which achieved fame by ferrying General La Fayette to the United States in 1780 to allow him to rejoin the American side in the American Revolutionary War.

Construction 
This project was conceived by members of the Centre International de la Mer in 1992, and construction began in 1997, envisaging a launch in April 2015 (as compared to the original, which took less than a year to build).

The shipyard was in one of the two dry docks beside the Corderie Royale at Rochefort.

As far as possible, traditional construction methods were used although modern power tools were substituted for the period tools on some jobs. The site is open to the public, and admission fees help fund the project.

Plans of a sister ship, were used. The cost was estimated to be  $22 million.
The original plans had been modified in several ways for reasons of strength and safety: planks had been bolted rather than pegged to avoid movement during the long period of construction. Similarly, the mast sections were fastened with glue rather than metal hoops to avoid water penetration. The cannons are lightweight and non-functional to save weight. Manilla rope has been used for the majority of the rigging and the sails made of linen canvas.

An engine will be used for safety, and electric generators for lighting and basic amenities.

2015 voyage
In preparation for a transatlantic voyage in 2015, the frigate departed from Rochefort and started her seaworthiness trials on 7 September 2014.

In April 2015, Hermione started her return voyage to the United States. Hermione’s itinerary is meant to reaffirm the relationship between the United States and France.

Hermione departed from La Rochelle on 18 April 2015.

2018 voyage 

On 2 February 2018, the Hermione undertook another voyage leaving Rochefort for the Mediterranean with 11 stopovers including Tangier, Sète, Marseille and Toulon.

Gallery 
Photographs of the reconstruction from 2005.

Photographs of the reconstruction from 2006.

Photographs of the reconstruction from 2009.

Photographs after completion

See also 
Ship replica (including a list of ship replicas).
 Götheborg, a sailing replica of an 18th-century Swedish East Indiaman.
Kalmar Nyckel, a replica of the 17th century merchant ship that brought Swedes to "New Sweden", the first Swedish colony in America.
HM Bark Endeavour, a replica of the 18th century bark commanded by Lieutenant James Cook.

Bibliography
 Emmanuel de Fontainieu, Yves Gaubert, L'Hermione, de Rochefort à la gloire américaine, Editions de Monza, 2002 
 Robert Kalbach, Jean-Luc Gireaud, L'Hermione, Frégate des Lumières, Dervy, 2004 
 Jean-Marie Ballu, L'Hermione, l'aventure de sa reconstruction, Editions du Gerfaut, 2007 
 James M. Volo, Blue Water Patriots: The American Revolution Afloat, Greenwood Publishing Group, 2007

References

External links

 Official website (French)
 Naval History : l'Hermione (French)
  L'Hermione - the frigate of enlightenment 
 The Lenox Project: a lasting legacy for Deptford A comparable London project to build a full-size sailing replica of HMS Lenox (1678) at a dedicated new museum on the site of the old Deptford Dockyard, where the original Lenox was built.

Age of Sail frigates of France
Ships built in France
2012 ships
Concorde-class frigates
Replica ships
Rochefort, Charente-Maritime
Tall ships of France